Prabir Ghosh (born 1 March 1945) is the founder and president of Bharatiya Bigyan O Yuktibadi Samiti, a science and rationalists' association based in Kolkata, India. He is the author of a number of books in Bengali disputing supernatural claims and is well known for his book series titled Aloukik Noy, Loukik.

Early life and family 
Prabir Ghosh born on 1 March 1945 at the Faridpur (Now in Bangladesh). His parents were Mr. Prabhat Chandra Ghosh and Smt. Suhasini Ghosh. His father moved to Adra, Purulia when he was six months old. He spent his early childhood in Adra. Young Prabir came to railway town Kharagpur in 1955. He completed his secondary education from Kharagpur. Later his father settled in Dum dum, Kolkata, in 1960. Ghosh completed graduation in Kolkata. He used to imitate the street magicians in those days.

₹5,000,000 miracle challenge 
Similar to James Randi's One Million Dollar Paranormal Challenge, Ghosh has offered a prize of ₹5 million (US$ 78,600 approx) to anyone who can demonstrate supernatural power of any kind without resorting to any trick, although he admitted that he personally does not possess such an amount of money.

Major works 
 Aloukik Noy, Loukik (in Bengali) (English title: "Natural, not Supernatural" in five volumes)'
 Uncovering Mother Teresa's miracle power.

Bibliography
Books in Bengali
 Sanskriti: songhorso o nirman (1994)
 Aloukik noi loukik (1 to 5 vol)
 Rajnititr management o aro kichu (2008)
 Kasmire ajadir lorai ekti itihasik dalil (2010)
 Yuktibadir chokhe gita ramayan mahavarat (2016)
 Prabad sanskar o kusanskar: (1999)
 Prem bibaho o onnyanya: (2017)
 Piknaki o Olukik Rohosya samagra (2015)
 Alukik Rohosya Sondhane Pinki: (2015)
 Aparadh Bigyan (2017)
 Memory man o moblibe baba (2008)
 Baree barre ghure firre tumi
 Amar chelebela (Early days biography of Prabir Ghosh)
 Juoboner Bojronirghos (Biogryphy ) (2013)
 Yuktibadir Challengerrra (Part-1 and 2)
 Goltablee saf Jabab
 Sommohoner A to Z
 Gerila juddher A to Z theke Azadi
 Moner Niyantran Yog o meditation
 Jotisher koffine ses perek
 Ami keno Isware Biswas korina
 Yuktibadir chokhe nari mukti
 Dhormo seba o sommohon
 Prosonya santras ebong
 Alukik rohoyajale pinki
 Alukik Dhristi Rohosya

Books in English
 Paranormal Exposed!
 The Mystery of Mother Teresa and Sainthood
 Why I Do Not Believe in God

See also 
 Federation of Indian Rationalist Associations
 Maharashtra Rationalist Association
 The One Million Dollar Paranormal Challenge
 List of prizes for evidence of the paranormal
 Narendra Nayak
 Basava Premanand

References

External links 
 Ghosh's essay on Baba Ramdev
 The Freethinker – A website run by Ghosh

1945 births
Living people
Writers from Kolkata
Bengali-language writers
Prizes for proof of paranormal phenomena
Indian sceptics
Indian rationalists
Indian atheism activists